TV Perú is the flagship public television network of Peruvian state broadcaster IRTP. It is Peru's first channel and the one to have the widest coverage area in the country.

In 2010, it started broadcasting on digital terrestrial television and became the first TV network in the country to do so.  Its headquarters are located in the Santa Beatriz neighbourhood in Lima district, Lima.

History

On 12 January 1957, the Communications General Regulation was issued by the government, which consisted in updated sections around television broadcasting, reserving VHF channels 5 and 7 to the Peruvian state. Dedicated headquarters for the new channel were inaugurated on the 22nd floor of the Education Ministry building (at the time, the tallest in Lima), with a small antenna on the building's rooftop and a medium 150 watt transmitter. In April of that same year, the Industrial Promotion Law was declared to be applicable to television, allowing it the tax exempt import of broadcasting equipment, as most shops in Lima were already selling TV sets of different brands.
By mid-1957, viewers could receive the channel as a test broadcast. On 17 January 1958, Lima's channel 7 was founded as a joint venture by UNESCO and the Peruvian government identifying itself as OAD-TV. Its first broadcast was the airing of a technical documentary about television and installation of antennas. It broadcast three times per week and was operated by the Electronic School of the Public Education Ministry. Its first programmes were Quince minutos de canciones, Informativo del canal, Melodías de antaño, Album criollo, among others.

Between 1959 and 1962, its broadcasts were interrupted due to a reorganisation in the network's management. In 1961, due to internal conflicts, the channel 7 management was divided in two groups: the Channel 7 Television Station (Estación de Televisión Canal 7) and the Electronic School Inca Garcilaso OAD TV Channel 7 (Escuela de Electrónica Inca Garcilaso OAD TV Canal 7). As these issues were later resolved, the network resumes normal broadcasts in 14 June, with broadcasts from 5:00 p.m. to 9:00 p.m. By that time, it already had regular programming that aired for three hours from Monday to Saturday, solely focused on cultural themes.

In the 1980s the station started satellite transmissions across Peru. In 1985, under Alan García's government, the TV station was given the popular TV Perú (but the legal name remained RTP). In 1996, RTP renamed to its current corporate name Television Nacional del Perú during Alberto Fujimori's regime. In 2006 the station was renamed again to TV Perú.

Nowadays TV Perú is better known for its regular programming devoted to spread Peruvian culture, by showing documentaries such as Reportaje al Perú and Costumbres. Sometime during the mid-2000s (decade) aired reruns of korean dramas dubbed into Spanish such as All About Eve, A wish upon star among others.

On 30 March 2010, TV Perú launched its high-definition signal on digital terrestrial television (using ISDB-TB) with the collaboration of the government of Japan who provided the proper equipment.

TV Perú is well known because the bad management of its media, due to the non-professional president and some of its managers who lead the channel and the radio station. From its first days, this channel is located in the lowest place in the ranking of channels in Peru.

TV Perú's headquarters are in Lima, Peru.

Logos

See also
TV Perú 7.3
TV Perú 7.4

External links
Official Site 

Television networks in Peru
Publicly funded broadcasters
Television stations in Peru
Television channels and stations established in 1958
Spanish-language television stations
State media
1958 establishments in Peru